SAICA  may refer to:
 South African Institute of Chartered Accountants, a non-profit association
 Sociedades anónimas inscrito de capital abierto, a type of companies in Argentina
 Succinylaminoimidazolecarboxamide riboside (SAICA riboside), a molecule whose appearance is characteristic of the disease adenylosuccinate lyase deficiency

Saica may refer to:
 Saica (bug), a genus of bugs in the family Reduviidae